The International Dental Show (IDS) in Cologne is the world's leading trade fair for the dental industry.

History 
The IDS is the world's most important trade fair for dental medicine and dental technology. The trade fair is organized by the GFDI (Gesellschaft zur Förderung der Dental-Industrie mbH), the commercial enterprise of the Association of German Dental Manufacturers (VDDI) and staged by Koelnmesse GmbH.

At IDS 2011, 1,954 companies from 58 countries participated and more than 100.000 trade visitors attended.

At IDS 2013, 2.058 companies from 56 countries presented their products on exhibition space covering 150.000 m². The exhibition had more than 125.000 trade visitors from 149 countries. IDS is the world's leading trade fair for the dental industry regarding number of exhibitors, internationality, booked exhibition space and number of visitors.

The 36th International Dental Show took place from 10 to 14 March 2015 and achieved a record result . On a gross exhibition area of 157.000 m², 2.201 companies from 56 countries participated. Overall, around 138.500 trade visitors from 151 countries attended IDS 2015.

The 37th International Dental Show took place from 21 to 25 March 2017. A total of 2.236 exhibitors from 58 countries and 155.132 visitors  from 156 countries participated in the event.

The 38th International Dental Show is scheduled for 12–16 March 2019.

Trade fair statistic

References

External links 
www.ids-cologne.de
Verband der Deutschen Dental-Industrie e.V.

Tourist attractions in Cologne
Trade fairs in Germany
Dental organizations
Recurring events established in 2007